The Syrian Communist Party is an anti-revisionist Marxist–Leninist communist party in Syria. The party emerged from a split in the Syrian Communist Party in 1986, as formed by the anti-Perestroika faction led by Khalid Bakdash. Khalid Bakdash died in 1995 and was succeeded as secretary of his party faction by his widow, Wisal Farha Bakdash.
At the time of the 2000 Damascus Spring, the party was able to publish a newspaper called Sawt al-Shaab ("Voice of the People").

Currently the party’s secretary general, who succeeded his mother in the party’s leadership. 

Mohammad Fayez al-Barasha is the party's only cabinet minister.

Parliamentary elections

References

External links

 Official website (archive)
 

1986 establishments in Syria
Communist parties in Syria
Anti-revisionist organizations
Stalinist parties
Political parties established in 1986
Political parties in Syria
International Meeting of Communist and Workers Parties